SQ4 may refer to:

 SQ4, a galactic quadrant in the Milky Way
 SQ4, a mixtape by Lil Wayne
 Space Quest IV, an adventure game by Sierra Entertainment